Föhr Frisian, or Fering, is the dialect of North Frisian spoken on the island of Föhr in the German region of North Frisia.  Fering refers to the Fering Frisian name of Föhr, Feer. Together with the Öömrang, Söl'ring, and Heligolandic dialects, it forms part of the insular group of North Frisian dialects and it is very similar to Öömrang.

Status
Around 3,000 of Föhr's 8,700 people speak Fering (1,500 of them being native speakers), constituting a third of all North Frisian speakers. An unknown number of emigrants in the United States of America, mainly in New York and Northern California, speak Fering as well. Fering differs from other North Frisian dialects in that it is also used publicly on Föhr, not only at home. The municipalities of Oldsum and Süderende (Fering: Olersem, Söleraanj) in the western part of Föhr are strongholds of the dialect.

Personal and family names
Personal names on Föhr are still today greatly influenced by a Frisian element. Notably hypocorisms and names with two elements are common. Early borrowings were made from the Danish language and the Christianisation of the North Frisians around 1000 A.D. brought a modest influence of Christian and biblical names. In the Age of Sail, Dutch and West Frisian forms became popular.

Family names were usually patronymic, i. e. they were individually created as genitives from the father's given name. Contrary to the Scandinavian Petersen or Petersson, meaning "Peter's son", a Fering name like Peters means "of Peter". This practice was prohibited by the Danish Crown in 1771 for the Duchy of Schleswig and was therefore abandoned in the eastern part of Föhr. As western Föhr was a direct part of the Danish kingdom until 1864, patronyms were in use there until 1828 when they were forbidden in Denmark proper as well.

Loanwords
Apart from Dutch names, the seafarers in Dutch service also introduced many loanwords in Dutch language to Fering which are still in use today. It has been observed that apart from Afrikaans, no other language outside the Netherlands proper has been influenced as much by the Dutch language as the North Frisian insular dialects. Examples for Fering include:

Other loanwords were derived from American English when many people emigrated from Föhr to the United States but kept contact with their relatives on the island. Examples include:

Phonology

The r is always pronounced as alveolar trill. Initial s is always voiceless.

The diphthongs  ia, ua and ui as well as the triphthong uai are falling diphthongs, i.e. the stress is always on the first vowel.

Orthography 
The current orthographic rules for Fering and Öömrang were defined in 1971. Previously, linguists like L. C. Peters, Otto Bremer and Reinhard Arfsten had each created their own Fering orthography. Long vowels including those with umlauts are always written as double letters while consonants are short by default. Capital letters are only used in the beginning of a sentence and for proper names.

Grammar

Nouns

Gender
Fering originally had 3 genders: masculine, feminine and neuter. However during the course of the twentieth century the feminine and neuter genders have combined.

Number
Fering nouns have two numbers – singular and plural. There are two major suffixes used to form the plural: "-er" and "-en". Nouns with a masculine gender often use the "-er" plural (although there are a few feminine/neuter nouns in this group) and nouns with a feminine/neuter gender often use the "-en" plural (there are a few masculine nouns in this group). Plurals can also be formed using "-in", "-n" and "-s". There are also plurals formed by changing a consonant at the end of the word, by changing a vowel within the word or by retaining the same form as the singular. Occasionally the plural form is formed by using a different word.

 An example of a masculine noun using the "-er" plural suffix:  (dog) –  (dogs).

 An example of a feminine/neuter noun using the "-en" plural suffix: buk (book) – buken (books).

 An example of a (feminine/neuter) noun using the "-en" plural suffix:  (office – i.e., a type of position) –  (offices).

 An example of a (masculine) noun using the "-n" plural suffix:  (painter) –  (painters).

 An example of a (masculine) noun using the "-s" plural suffix:  (captain) –  (captains).

 Examples of feminine/neuter nouns which retain the same form as the singular include: bian (bone(s), leg(s), gris (piglet(s)), schep (sheep, singular and plural) and swin (pig(s)).

Verbs
In Fering, there are three groups of verbs: weak, strong and irregular verbs.

Fering literature
There are various Fering authors. One of the first publicly noticed writers was Arfst Jens Arfsten (1812–1899) who began writing anecdotes in Fering around 1855. Others include Stine Andresen (1849–1927) who was a poet and writer from Wyk whose literature often refers to her native island. She published her poetry in German but also in Fering. In 1991, Ellin Nickelsen's novelette Jonk Bradlep (Dark Wedding) was published. With it, she won the first ever held North Frisian literature competition.

See also
Leew Eilun Feer

References

External links
 Ocke-Schwen Bohn's home page Speech samples and a phonetic description of Fering

Föhr
North Frisian language